Kickback, The Kickback or Kick Back can refer to:

Mechanical movement
 Kickback, the result of a mechanical fault in a cylinder of an engine which fires before the piston reaches the top. The piston then goes backward while the other pistons in the other cylinders are still going upwards. This counter-motion in the system sends a shocking impact to the whole engine and accessories named kickback.
 Kickback, another term for recoil in a gun
 Kickback (pinball), a ball-saving mechanism in a pinball table
Chainsaw kickback, in which a chainsaw encounters hard wood and violently surges upward.
 Steering kickback, movement in a vehicle's steering wheel when it encounters an obstacle.

Payment
 Kickback (bribery), a form of bribery in which payment is received for services rendered
 Kickback, a bidding convention in contract bridge; see Glossary of contract bridge terms#kickback

Entertainment
 Kickback (gaming platform), an online gaming site
 The Kickback (band), a band from Vermillion, South Dakota
 The Kickback (album), an album by Cali Swag District
 The Kickback (film), a 1922 film
 Kickback (Transformers), a character that is part of The Transformers toy line
 "Kickback" (The Professionals), a television episode
 Kick Back, an EP by WayV
 "Kick Back" (song), by Kenshi Yonezu

Other
 Kh-15, a Russian air-to-surface missile also known as the "Kickback"